Hichocollo (possibly from Aymara jichu Peruvian feather grass, qullu mountain, "ichhu mountain") is a mountain in the Chila mountain range in the Andes of Peru which reaches a height of approximately . It is located in the Arequipa Region, Caylloma Province, Tapay District. Hichocollo lies east of the Molloco River which is a right affluent of Colca River.

References 

Mountains of Peru
Mountains of Arequipa Region